The Filmfare Lyricist Award is given by the Filmfare magazine as part of its annual Filmfare Awards for Hindi films.

The awards were first given in 1954; however, the Award for the best lyricist was first given in 1959.

List of winners

1950s
 1959 Shailendra – "Yeh Mera Deewanapan Hain" from Yahudi
 Sahir Ludhianvi – "Aurat Ne Janam Diya" from Sadhna
 Shailendra – "Meri Jaan" from Yahudi

1960s
 1960 Shailendra – "Sab Kuchh Seekha Hum Ne" from Anari
 Majrooh Sultanpuri – "Jalte Hain Jiske Liye" from Sujata
 Sahir Ludhianvi – "Tu Hindu Banega" from Dhool Ka Phool
 1961 Shakeel Badayuni – "Chaudhvin Ka Chand" from Chaudhvin Ka Chand
 Shailendra – "Dil Apna Aur Preet Parai" from Dil Apna Aur Preet Parai
 Shakeel Badayuni – "Pyar Kiya To Darna Kiya" from Mughal-e-Azam
 1962 Shakeel Badayuni – "Husn Wale Tera" from Gharana
 Hasrat Jaipuri – "Teri Pyari Pyari Surat" from Sasural
 Shailendra – "Hothon Pe Sacchai" from Jis Desh Men Ganga Behti Hai
 1963 Shakeel Badayuni – "Kahin Deep Jale" from Bees Saal Baad
 Hasrat Jaipuri – "Ae Gulbadan" from Professor
 Raja Mehdi Ali Khan – "Aapki Nazrone" from Anpadh
 1964 Sahir Ludhianvi – "Jo Waada Kiya" from Taj Mahal
 Sahir Ludhianvi – "Chalo Ek Bar Phir Se" from Gumrah
 Shakeel Badayuni – "Mere Mehboob Tujhe Meri" from Mere Mehboob
 1965 Majrooh Sultanpuri – "Chahunga Main Tujhe" from Dosti
 Bharat Vyas – "Jyot Se Jyot Jagate Chalo" from Sant Gyaneshwar
 Shailendra – "Dost Dost Na Raha" from Sangam
 1966 Rajendra Krishan – "Tumhi Mere Mandir" from Khandan
 Hasrat Jaipuri – "Aji Rooth Kar Ab Kahan" from Arzoo
 Indeevar – "Ek Tu Na Mila" from Himalay Ki Godmein
 1967 Hasrat Jaipuri – "Baharon Phool Barsao" from Suraj
 Shailendra – "Sajan Re Jhoot" from Teesri Kasam
 Shakeel Badayuni – "Naseeb Me Jiske" from Do Badan
 1968 Gulshan Kumar Mehta – "Mere Desh Ki Dharti" from Upkar
 Anand Bakshi – "Sawan Ka Mahina" from Milan
 Sahir Ludhianvi – "Neele Gagan Ke Tale" from Hamraaz
 1969 Shailendra – "Main Gaoon Tum" from Brahmachari
 Hasrat Jaipuri – "Dil Ke Jharoke Mein" from Brahmachari
 Sahir Ludhianvi – "Milti Hai Zindagi Mein" from Aankhen

1970s
 1970 Neeraj – "Kal Ka Paiya" from Chanda Aur Bijli
 Anand Bakshi – "Badi Mastani Hai" from Jeene Ki Raah
 Anand Bakshi – "Kora Kagaz Tha" from Aradhana
 1971 Verma Malik – "Sabse Bada Nadan" from Pehchan
 Anand Bakshi – "Bindiya Chamkegi" from Do Raaste
 Neeraj – "Bas Yehi Apradh" from Pehchan
 1972 Hasrat Jaipuri – "Zindagi Ek Safar Hai Suhana" from Andaz
 Anand Bakshi – "Na Koi Umang Hai" from Kati Patang
 Neeraj – "Ae Bhai Zara Dekh Ke Chalo" from Mera Naam Joker
 1973 Verma Malik – "Jai Bolo Be-Imaan Ki" from Be-Imaan
 Anand Bakshi – "Chingari Koi Bhadke" from Amar Prem
 Santosh Anand – "Ek Pyaar Ka Nagma Hain" from Shor
 1974 Gulshan Kumar Mehta – "Yaari Hai Imaan Mera" from Zanjeer
 Anand Bakshi – "Hum Tum Ek Kamre Mein Band Ho" from Bobby
 Anand Bakshi – "Main Shayar To Nahin" from Bobby
 Indeevar – "Samjhauta Ghamose Kar Lo" from Samjhauta
 Vithalbhai Patel – "Jhooth Bole Kauwa Kaate" from Bobby
 1975 Santosh Anand – "Main Na Bhooloonga" from Roti Kapda Aur Makaan
 Anand Bakshi – "Gaadi Bula Rahi Hai" from Dost
 Indeevar – "Behnane Bhai Ki Kalai" from Resham Ki Dori
 M. G. Hashmat – "Mera Jeevan Kora Kagaz" from Kora Kagaz
 Santosh Anand – "Aur Nahi Bus Aur Nahin" from Roti Kapda Aur Makaan
 1976 Indeevar – "Dil Aisa Kisi" from Amanush
 Anand Bakshi – "Aayegi Zaroor Chiththi" from Dulhan
 Anand Bakshi – "Mehbooba O Mehbooba" from Sholay
 Gulzar – "Tere Bina Zindagi Se" from Aandhi
 Vishweshwar Sharma – "Chal Sanyasi Mandir Mein" from Sanyasi
 1977 Sahir Ludhianvi – "Kabhi Kabhie Mere Dil Mein" from Kabhi Kabhie
 Anand Bakshi – "Mere Naina Sawan Bhadon" from Mehbooba
 Gulzar – "Dil Dhoondta Hai" from Mausam
 Majrooh Sultanpuri – "Ek Din Bik Jaayega" from Dharam Karam
 Sahir Ludhianvi – "Main Pal Do Pal Ka Shayar" from Kabhi Kabhie
 1978 Gulzar – "Do Deewaane Sheher Mein" from Gharaonda
 Anand Bakshi – "Parda Hai Parda" from Amar Akbar Anthony
 Gulzar – "Naam Gum Jaayega" from Kinara
 Majrooh Sultanpuri – "Kya Hua Tera Waada" from Hum Kisise Kum Naheen
 Preeti Sagar – "Mera Gaon Kadhapane" from Manthan
 1979 Anand Bakshi – "Aadmi Musafir Hai" from Apnapan
 Anand Bakshi – "Main Tulsi Tere Aangan Ki" from Main Tulsi Tere Aangan Ki
 Anjaan – "Khaike Paan Banaraswala" from Don
 Pandit Narendra Sharma – "Satyam Shivam Sundaram" from Satyam Shivam Sundaram
 Ravindra Jain – "Ankhiyon Ke Jharokhon Se" from Ankhiyon Ke Jharokhon Se

1980s
 1980 Gulzar – "Aanewala Pal" from Gol Maal
 Anand Bakshi – "Sawan Ke Jhoole Pade" from Jurmana
 Anand Bakshi – "Dafliwale" from Sargam
 Jan Nisar Akhtar – "Aaja Re Mere Dilbar Aaja" from Noorie
 Sahir Ludhianvi – "Dil Ke Tukde Tukde Kar Ke" from Dada
 1981 Gulzar – "Hazaar Raahen Mud Ke Dekhi" from Thodisi Bewafaii
 Anand Bakshi – "Dard-e-Dil" from Karz
 Anand Bakshi – "Om Shanti Om" from Karz
 Anand Bakshi – "Salaamat Rahe Dostana Hamara" from Dostana
 Anand Bakshi – "Shisha Ho Ya Dil Ho" from Aasha
 1982 Anand Bakshi – "Tere Mere Beech Mein" from Ek Duuje Ke Liye
 Anand Bakshi – "Solah Baras Ki Bali Umar" from Ek Duuje Ke Liye
 Anand Bakshi – "Yaad Aa Rahi Hai" from Love Story
 Gulzar – "Jahaan Pe Savera" from Baseraa
 Santosh Anand – "Zindagi Ki Naa Toote" from Kranti
 1983 Santosh Anand – "Mohabbat Hai Kya Cheez" from Prem Rog
 Amir Qazalbash – "Meri Kismat" from Prem Rog
 Anjaan & Prakash Mehra – "Pag Ghungroo Baandh" from Namak Halaal
 Hasan Kamal – "Dil Ke Armaan" from Nikaah
 Hasan Kamal – "Dil Ki Yeh Arzoo Thi" from Nikaah
 1984 Gulzar – "Tujhse Naaraz Nahi Zindagi" from Masoom
 Anand Bakshi – "Jab Hum Jawan Hoge" from Betaab
 Gulshan Kumar Mehta – "Hamen Aur Jeene Ki" from Agar Tum Na Hote
 Sawan Kumar Tak – "Shayad Meri Shaadi" from Souten
 Sawan Kumar Tak – "Zindagi Pyar Ka Geet Hai" from Souten
 1985 Hasan Kamal – "Aaj Ki Awaaz" from Aaj Ki Awaaz
 Anand Bakshi – "Sohni Chinam Di" from Sohni Mahiwal
 Anjaan – "Manzilein Apni Jagah Hain" from Sharaabi
 Anjaan and Prakash Mehra – "Inteha Ho Gayi" from Sharaabi
 Indeevar – "Pyar Ka Tohfa Tera" from Tohfa
 1986 Vasant Dev – "Man Kyon Behka" from Utsav
 Anand Bakshi – "Zindagi Har Kadam" from Meri Jung
 Anjaan  – "Yaar Bina Chain Kahaan Re" from Saaheb
 Hasan Kamal – "Bahut Der Se" from Tawaif
 Hasrat Jaipuri – "Sun Sahiba Sun" from Ram Teri Ganga Maili
 Javed Akhtar – "Saagar Kinare" from Saagar
 1987 No award given
 1988 No award given
 1989 Gulzar – "Mera Kuchh Saamaan" from Ijaazat
 Javed Akhtar – "Ek Do Teen" from Tezaab
 Majrooh Sultanpuri – "Papa Kehte Hain" from Qayamat Se Qayamat Tak

1990s
 1990 Asad Bhopali – "Dil Deewana" from Maine Pyar Kiya
 Anand Bakshi – "Lagi Aaj Sawan" from Chandni
 Dev Kohli – "Aate Jaate Hanste Gaate" from Maine Pyar Kiya
 1991 Sameer – "Nazar Ke Saamne" from Aashiqui
 Rani Malik – "Dheere Dheere Se" from Aashiqui
 Sameer – "Naa Jaane Kahan Dil Kho Gaya" from Dil
 1992 Gulzar – "Yaara Seeli Seeli" from Lekin...
 Anand Bakshi  – "Kabhi Main Kahoon" from Lamhe
 Faaiz Anwar – "Dil Hai Ke Manta Nahin" from Dil Hai Ke Manta Nahin
 Ravindra Jain – "Main Hoon Khushrang Henna" from Henna
 Sameer – "Mera Dil Bhi" from Saajan
 1993 Sameer – "Teri Umeed Tera Intezar Karte Hai" from Deewana
 Majrooh Sultanpuri – "Woh Sikander Hi Dosto" from Jo Jeeta Wohi Sikandar
 Sameer – "Aisi Deewangi" from Deewana
 1994 Sameer – "Ghungat Ke Aad Se" from Hum Hain Rahi Pyar Ke
 Anand Bakshi – "Choli Ke Peeche" from Khalnayak
 Anand Bakshi – "Jaadu Teri Nazar" from Darr
 Dev Kohli – "Yeh Kaali Kaali Ankhen" from Baazigar
 Gulzar – "Dil Hum Hum" from Rudaali
 1995 Javed Akhtar – "Ek Ladki Ko Dekha" from 1942: A Love Story
 Anand Bakshi – "Tu Cheez Badi" from Mohra
 Dev Kohli – "Hum Aapke Hain Koun" from Hum Aapke Hain Koun..!
 Sameer – "Ole Ole" from Yeh Dillagi
 1996 Anand Bakshi – "Tujhe Dekha To" from Dilwale Dulhania Le Jayenge
 Anand Bakshi – "Ho Gaya Hai Tujhko To Pyar Sajna" from Dilwale Dulhania Le Jayenge
 Majrooh Sultanpuri – "Raja Ko Rani Se Pyar" from Akele Hum Akele Tum
 Mehboob – "Kya Kare" from Rangeela
 Mehboob – "Tanha Tanha" from Rangeela
 1997 Javed Akhtar – "Ghar Se Nikalte" from Papa Kehte Hai
 Gulzar – "Chappa Chappa Charkha Chale" from Maachis
 Majrooh Sultanpuri – "Aaj Main Upar" from Khamoshi: The Musical
 Nida Fazli – "Jeevan Kya Hai" from Is Raat Ki Subah Nahin
 Sameer – "Pardesi Pardesi" from Raja Hindustani
 1998 Javed Akhtar – "Sandese Aate Hai" from Border
 Anand Bakshi – "Bholi Si Surat" from Dil To Pagal Hai
 Anand Bakshi – "I Love My India" from Pardes
 Anand Bakshi – "Zara Tasveer Se Tu" from Pardes
 Javed Akhtar – "Chand Taare" from Yes Boss
 1999 Gulzar – "Chaiyya Chaiyya" from Dil Se..
 Gulzar – "Ae Ajnabi" from Dil Se..
 Javed Akhtar – "Mere Mehboob Mere Sanam" from Duplicate
 Sameer – "Ladki Badi Anjaani Hai" from Kuch Kuch Hota Hai
 Sameer – "Tum Paas Aaye" from Kuch Kuch Hota Hai

2000s
 2000 Anand Bakshi – "Ishq Bina" from Taal
 Anand Bakshi – "Taal Se Taal Mila" from Taal
 Israr Ansari – "Zindagi Maut Na Ban Jaaye" from Sarfarosh
 Mehboob – "Aankhon Ki Gustakhiyan" from Hum Dil De Chuke Sanam
 Mehboob – "Tadap Tadap Ke" from Hum Dil De Chuke Sanam
 2001 Javed Akhtar – "Panchchi Nadiyaan" from Refugee
 Anand Bakshi – "Hum Ko Humise Chura Lo" from Mohabbatein
 Gulzar – "Aaja Mahiya" from Fiza
 Ibrahim Ashq – "Naa Tum Jaano Naa Hum" from Kaho Naa... Pyaar Hai
 Sameer – "Tum Dil Ki Dhadkan Me" from Dhadkan
 2002 Javed Akhtar – "Mitwa" from Lagaan
 Anand Bakshi – "Udja Kale Kawan" from Gadar: Ek Prem Katha
 Anil Pandey – "Suraj Hua Maddham" from Kabhi Khushi Kabhie Gham...
 Javed Akhtar – "Radha Kaise Naa Jale" from Lagaan
 Sameer – "Kabhi Khushi Kabhi Gham" from Kabhi Khushi Kabhie Gham
 2003 Gulzar – "Saathiya" from Saathiya
 Nusrat Badr – "Dola Re" from Devdas
 Sameer – "Aapke Pyaar Mein" from Raaz
 Sudhakar Sharma – "Sanam Mere Humraaz" from Humraaz
 Sudhakar Sharma – "Tumne Zindagi Mein Aake" from Humraaz
 2004 Javed Akhtar – "Kal Ho Naa Ho" from Kal Ho Naa Ho
 Javed Akhtar – "Tauba Tumhare" from Chalte Chalte
 Javed Akhtar – "Ek Saathi" from LOC Kargil
 Sameer – "Kissi Se Tum Pyar Karo" from Andaaz
 Sameer – "Tere Naam" from Tere Naam
 2005 Javed Akhtar – "Tere Liye" from Veer-Zaara
 Javed Akhtar – "Aisa Des Hai Mera" from Veer-Zaara
 Javed Akhtar – "Main Hoon Na" from Main Hoon Na
 Javed Akhtar – "Main Yahan Hoon" from Veer-Zaara
 Javed Akhtar – "Yeh Taara Woh Taara" from Swades
 2006 Gulzar – "Kajra Re" from Bunty Aur Babli
 Gulzar – "Chup Chup Ke" from Bunty Aur Babli
 Gulzar – "Dheere Jalna" from Paheli
 Sameer – "Aashiq Banaya Aapne" from Aashiq Banaya Aapne
 Swanand Kirkire – "Piyu Bole" from Parineeta
 2007 Prasoon Joshi – "Chand Sifarish" from Fanaa
 Gulzar – "Beedi" from Omkara
 Javed Akhtar – "Kabhi Alvida Naa Kehna" from Kabhi Alvida Naa Kehna
 Javed Akhtar – "Mitwa" from Kabhi Alvida Naa Kehna
 Prasoon Joshi – "Roobaroo" from Rang De Basanti
 2008 Prasoon Joshi – "Maa" from Taare Zameen Par
 Gulzar – "Tere Bina" from Guru
 Javed Akhtar – "Main Agar Kahoon" from Om Shanti Om
 Sameer – "Jab Se Tere Naina" from Saawariya
 Vishal Dadlani – "Aankhon Mein Teri" from Om Shanti Om
 2009 Javed Akhtar – "Jashn-E-Bahara" from Jodhaa Akbar
 Abbas Tyrewala – "Kabhi Kabhi Aditi" from Jaane Tu... Ya Jaane Na
 Gulzar – "Tu Meri Dost Hai" from Yuvvraaj
 Jaideep Sahni – "Haule Haule" from Rab Ne Bana Di Jodi
 Javed Akhtar – "Socha Hai" from Rock On!!
 Prasoon Joshi – "Guzarish" from Ghajini

2010s
 2010 Irshad Kamil – "Aaj Din Chadheya" from Love Aaj Kal
 Gulzar – "Dhan Te Nan" from Kaminey
 Gulzar – "Kaminey" from Kaminey
 Javed Akhtar – "Iktara" from Wake Up Sid
 Prasoon Joshi – "Masakali" from Delhi-6
 Prasoon Joshi – "Rehna Tu" from Delhi-6
 2011 Gulzar – "Dil Toh Bachcha Hai Ji" from Ishqiya
 Faiz Anwar – "Tere Mast Mast Do Nain" from Dabangg
 Niranjan Iyengar – "Sajda" from My Name Is Khan
 Niranjan Iyengar – "Noor-e-Khuda" from My Name Is Khan
 Vishal Dadlani – "Bin Tere" from I Hate Luv Storys
 2012 Irshad Kamil – "Nadaan Parindey" from Rockstar
 Gulzar – "Darling" from 7 Khoon Maaf
 Irshad Kamil – "Sadda Haq" from Rockstar
 Javed Akhtar – "Señorita" from Zindagi Na Milegi Dobara
 Vishal Dadlani and Niranjan Iyengar – "Chammak Challo" from Ra.One
 2013 Gulzar – "Challa" from Jab Tak Hai Jaan
 Amitabh Bhattacharya – "Abhi Mujh Mein Kahin" from Agneepath
 Gulzar – "Saans" from Jab Tak Hai Jaan
 Javed Akhtar – "Jee Le Zaara" from Talaash
 Swanand Kirkire – "Aashiyan" from Barfi!
 2014 Prasoon Joshi – "Zinda" – Bhaag Milkha Bhaag
 Amitabh Bhattacharya – "Shikayatein" – Lootera
 Amitabh Bhattacharya – "Kabira" – Yeh Jawaani Hai Deewani
 Mithoon – "Tum Hi Ho" – Aashiqui 2
 Swanand Kirkire – "Manja" – Kai Po Che!
2015 Rashmi Singh –  "Muskurane" from CityLights 
 Amitabh Bhattacharya –  "Zehnaseeb" from Hasee Toh Phasee
 Gulzar –  "Bismil" from Haider
 Irshad Kamil –  "Pathaka Guddi" from Highway
 Kausar Munir –  "Suno Na Sangemarmar" from Youngistaan
2016 Irshad Kamil – "Agar Tum Saath Ho" – Tamasha 
Amitabh Bhattacharya – "Gerua" – Dilwale
Anvita Dutt Guptan – "Gulaabo" – Shaandaar
Gulzar – "Zinda" – Talvar 
Kumaar – "Sooraj Dooba Hain" – Roy
Varun Grover – "Moh Moh Ke Dhaage" – Dum Laga Ke Haisha
2017 Amitabh Bhattacharya – "Channa Mereya" – Ae Dil Hai Mushkil 
Irshad Kamil – "Jag Ghoomeya" – Sultan
Gulzar – "Aave Re Hitchki" – Mirzya
Gulzar – "Mirzya" – Mirzya
Kausar Munir – "Love You Zindagi" – Dear Zindagi
Shiv Kumar Batalvi – "Ikk Kudi" – Udta Punjab
2018 Amitabh Bhattacharya – "Ullu Ka Pattha" – Jagga Jasoos
Amitabh Bhattacharya – "Galti Se Mistake" – Jagga Jasoos
Arko Pravo Mukherjee – "Nazm Nazm" – Bareilly Ki Barfi
Kausar Munir – "Maana Ke Hum Yaar Nahin" – Meri Pyaari Bindu
Kausar Munir – "Nachdi Phira" – Secret Superstar
Santanu Ghatak – "Rafu" – Tumhari Sulu
 2019 Gulzar – "Ae Watan" – Raazi
 A. M Turaz – "Binte Dil" – Padmaavat
 Gulzar – "Dilbaro" – Raazi
 Irshad Kamil – "Mera Naam Tu" – Zero
 Kumaar – "Tera Yaar Hoon Main" – Sonu Ke Titu Ki Sweety
 Shekhar Astitva – "Kar Har Maidaan Fateh" – Sanju

2020s 
 2020 Divine, Ankur Tewari – "Apna Time Aayega " – Gully Boy
 Amitabh Bhattacharya – "Kalank" – Kalank
 Irshad Kamil – "Bekhayali" – Kabir Singh
 Manoj Muntashir – "Teri Mitti" – Kesari
 Mithoon – "Tujhe Kitna Chahne Lage Hum" – Kabir Singh
 Tanishk Bagchi – "Ve Maahi" – Kesari
 2021 Gulzar – "Chhapaak" from Chhapaak
 Irshad Kamil – "Mehrama" – Love Aaj Kal
 Irshad Kamil – "Shayad" – Love Aaj Kal
 Sayeed Quadri – "Humdum Hardam" – Ludo
 Shakeel Azmi – "Ek Tukda Dhoop" – Thappad
 Vayu – "Mere Liye Tum Kaafi Ho" – Shubh Mangal Zyada Saavdhan
 2022 Kausar Munir – "Lehra Do" – 83
 Irshad Kamil – "Rait Zara Si" – Atrangi Re
 Jaani – "Mann Bharrya 2.0" – Shershaah
 Manoj Muntashir – "Parinda" – Saina
 Tanishk Bagchi – "Raataan Lambiya" –Shershaah

Multiple winners and nominees

 13 : Gulzar (35)
 8 : Javed Akhtar (26)
 4 : Anand Bakshi (41)
 3 : Sameer (17)
 3 : Shailendra (9)
 3 : Prasoon Joshi (7)
 3 : Irshad Kamil (9)
 3 : Shakeel Badayuni (6)
 2 : Sahir Ludhianvi (9)
 2 : Amitabh Bhattacharya (8)
 2 : Hasrat Jaipuri (6)
 2 : Santosh Anand (5)
 2 : Gulshan Bawra (3)
 2 : Verma Malik (2)
 1 : Majrooh Sultanpuri (8)
 1 : Indeevar (5)
 1 : Kausar Munir (5)
 1 : Hasan Kamal (4)
 1 : Neeraj (3)
 0 : Anjaan (6)
 0 : Mehboob (4)
 0 : Niranjan Iyengar (3) 
 0 : Dev Kohli (3)
 0 : Vishal Dadlani (3)
 0 : Sudhakar Sharma (2)
 0 : Swanand Kirkire (2)
 0 : Faiz Anwar (2)
 0 : Ravindra Jain (2)
 0 : Sawan Kumar Tak (2)
 0 : Prakash Mehra (2)

Superlatives

With 13 wins, Gulzar holds the record for most awards in this category, followed by Javed Akhtar with 8 awards and Anand Bakshi with 4. Five lyricists won the award thrice: Shakeel Badayuni, Shailendra, Sameer,  Prasoon Joshi and Irshad Kamil. Badayuni, who won the award for three consecutive years from 1961 to 1963, holds the record for most consecutive wins.

In 2005, Javed Akhtar was the single nominee, having all the five nominations of this category to his credit (and eventually winning for "Tere Liye" from Veer-Zaara). Akhtar's five nominations in that year also gave him the record for most number of Best Lyricist nominations in a single year, thus surpassing a previous record by Anand Bakshi, who received four of the five nominations in 1981.

Anand Bakshi holds the record of getting nominated for consecutively 13 years from 1970 till 1982, resulting in 23 nominations and only 2 wins.
Anand Bakshi in 1981 lost all four nominations he received to Gulzar and in 1998 lost all three nominations to Javed Akhtar.

Shailendra was the first artist to win this award in 1959.  Shakeel Badayuni was the most successful lyricist in '60s with three consecutive wins.  Verma Malik fetched two awards from '70s.  Gulzar ruled '80s with four wins.  In '90s Sameer and Javed Akhtar both have three wins each.  Javed Akhtar continued his domination in the 2000s with five wins.  Irshad Kamil and Gulzar were the most successful lyricist of 2010s with three wins each.

As of 2022, only five women have ever been nominated for the award. First ever female lyricist to be nominated for the award was Preeti Sagar for the song "Mero Gaam Katha Parey" from the film Manthan in 1978. Rashmi Singh became the first woman to won the award in 2015 for "Muskurane Ki Wajah" from CityLights.

Kausar Munir became the second female songwriter to won; when she won it in 2022 for the song "Lehra Do" from 83. She is also the only female lyricist to have multiple nominations ever and also in a single year. She has five of total nine nominations by female songwriters in history.

The other two female lyricists nominated are Rani Malik for "Dheere Dheere Se" from Aashiqui (1991) and Anvita Dutt for "Gulaabo" from Shaandaar (2016).

See also
 Filmfare Awards

External links
Filmfare Awards Best Lyricist

Lyricist